Grace Quintanilla (1967 - 2019, Mexico City, Mexico) was an artist, curator and producer working in the field of new media art and digital culture.

Biography 
Quintinilla studied at Duncan of Jordanstone College of Art and Design in Dundee, Scotland in the Television and Electronic Imaging Course. She was a regular participant in the Interactive Screen programme of the Banff New Media Institute at The Banff Centre in Banff, Canada. She also received a Film/Video/Multimedia Fellowship from the Rockefeller Foundation in 2002 for her interactive project "Bits of Memory". Quintanilla was director of Centro de Cultura Digital from 2012 until her death in 2019.

References

1967 births
2019 deaths
20th-century Mexican women artists
21st-century Mexican women artists
Alumni of the University of Dundee
Mexican curators
Mexican women artists
New media artists